The Journalist is a 1979 Australian sex comedy about the romantic adventures of a journalist (Jack Thompson). It has the reputation as one of the worst Australian films of all time.

Plot
Journalist Simon Morris has trouble with his love life. He is separated from his wife Wendy and daughter Suzie and lives with his girlfriend Liz.

Production
Money came from Roadshow, who wanted Jack Thompson to play the lead, and the New South Wales Film Corporation. The shoot started January 1979 and went for four weeks.

Reception
The film was very poorly received critically and commercially. Thornhill:
The Journalist was a misfire completely and I think it was my fault entirely. We should never have had Jack Thompson. He was just miscast. He's not a comedian. He's a serious, solid actor. We should have had Sam Neill in the lead role and you would have had a debonair roue - it was meant to be a debonair roue. It was meant to be a piece of fluff, a piece of effervescent fluff that came out feeling like lard.

Robert Macklin wrote a novelisation of the script for $5,000.

References

External links

The Journalist at Oz Movies

The Journalist at National Film and Sound Archive

Australian sex comedy films
1970s English-language films
Films directed by Michael Thornhill
1970s Australian films